The Stories of Frank O'Connor is a 1952 short story collection by Frank O'Connor featuring both old and new stories.

Stories
The new stories appearing here in book form for the first time were:

My Oedipus Complex
My Da
The Pretender
First Love
Freedom

References

1952 short story collections
Short story collections by Frank O'Connor
Alfred A. Knopf books